Signorelli is a surname. Notable people with the surname include:

 Franco Signorelli (born 1991), Venezuelan footballer
 Frank Signorelli (1901–1975), American jazz pianist
 James Signorelli, American film director and cinematographer
 Luca Signorelli (c. 1445–1523), Italian Renaissance painter
 Marcelo Signorelli (born 1963), Italian-Uruguayan basketball player, coach, and author
 Maria Signorelli (1908-1992), Italian puppet master and collector
 Paolo Signorelli (politician) (1934-2010), Italian activist and politician 
 Paolo Signorelli (footballer) (1939-2018), Italian footballer
 Pietro Napoli Signorelli (1731–1815), Italian scholar of classic literature
 Vincent Signorelli, American punk-rock drummer

Italian-language surnames